The Anglican Diocese of Ogbia is one of ten within the Anglican Province of the Niger Delta, itself one of 14 provinces within the Church of Nigeria.

The diocese was created in 2008. James Oruwori is the incumbent bishop.

References

Church of Nigeria dioceses
Dioceses of the Province of Niger Delta